Alfonse Hunter (born February 21, 1955) is a former professional American football running back who played in four National Football League seasons from 1977-1980 for the Seattle Seahawks. Hunter played high school football at Junius H. Rose High School in North Carolina before going to Notre Dame where they won the national championship in 1973.  Hunter is primarily known as the first player to enter the NFL through the Supplemental Draft.

References

1955 births
Living people
Sportspeople from Greenville, North Carolina
Players of American football from North Carolina
American football running backs
Notre Dame Fighting Irish football players
Seattle Seahawks players